William Mack (February 29, 1828 – December 11, 1897) was an Ontario businessman and political figure. He represented Cornwall from 1879 to 1883, Cornwall and Stormont from 1886 to 1890 and Stormont from 1890 to 1894 in the Legislative Assembly of Ontario as a Liberal member.

He was born in Lanarkshire, Scotland in 1828, the son of Robert Mack, and was brought to Huntingdon County, Lower Canada, by his parents during his first year of life. He grew up there and moved to Cornwall, Canada West in 1849, where he managed a gristmill. In 1855, he married Agnes Henderson. Mack went into business on his own, also helping to establish paper, cotton and woollen mills at Cornwall. He served as reeve of Cornwall in 1871 and 1876 and as warden for the United Counties of Stormont, Dundas and Glengarry in 1878. He was defeated by Alexander Peter Ross for the seat in the provincial assembly in 1883 but elected again in 1886.

His daughter Margaret married Alexander McCracken, who was a mayor of Cornwall, and his son William R. later served as sheriff for the United Counties.

References

External links 
The Canadian parliamentary companion, 1889 JA Gemmill

A Cyclopæedia of Canadian biography : being chiefly men of the time ..., GM Rose (1886)
Stormont, Dundas and Glengarry : a history, 1784-1945, JG Harkness (1946)
William Mack family fonds, Archives of Ontario

1828 births
1897 deaths
Immigrants to Lower Canada
Mayors of Cornwall, Ontario
Ontario Liberal Party MPPs
Scottish emigrants to pre-Confederation Ontario
Scottish emigrants to pre-Confederation Quebec